Fatty acid binding protein 7, brain (FABP7; also brain lipid binding protein, BLBP), is a human gene.

Function 

The protein encoded by this gene is a brain fatty acid binding protein. Fatty acid binding proteins (FABPs) are a family of small, highly conserved, cytoplasmic proteins that bind long-chain fatty acids and other hydrophobic ligands. FABPs are thought to play roles in fatty acid uptake, transport, and metabolism.

FABP7 is expressed, during development, in radial glia by the activation of Notch receptors. Reelin was shown to induce FABP7 expression in neural progenitor cells via Notch-1 activation.

According to one study, FABP7 binds DHA with the highest affinity among all of the FABPs.

Role in pathology
FABP7 maps onto human chromosome 6q22.31, a schizophrenia linkage region corroborated by a meta-analysis.

As of 2008, two studies have been conducted into FABP7 as a possible risk gene for schizophrenia, with one, that tested for only one SNP, showing negative and another, with seven SNPs, a positive result. The effect of the gene in the latter study was stronger in males. This study also linked FABP7 variation to weak prepulse inhibition in mice; deficit in PPI is an endophenotypic trait observed in schizophrenia patients and their relatives.

References

Further reading

External links 
Schizophrenia, Startled Response & Fabp7: Future Dietary Changes for At-Risk Mothers? Schizophrenia Daily News Blog, 2007-11-07
 - a synopsis for the general audience.
 

Biology of bipolar disorder